Curtis Hamilton (born December 4, 1991) is an American-born Canadian professional ice hockey forward. He last played with the Manchester Storm in the British Elite Ice Hockey League (EIHL). Hamilton previously skated for the Graz 99ers in the Austrian Hockey League (EBEL). Hamilton was selected by the Edmonton Oilers in the 2nd round (48th overall) of the 2010 NHL Entry Draft.

Playing career
Hamilton was born in Tacoma, Washington, but grew up in Kelowna, British Columbia when his father, Bruce owned the Tacoma Rockets (which relocated to Kelowna in 1995). Prior to turning professional, he played major junior hockey in the Western Hockey League (WHL) with the Saskatoon Blades.

On April 18, 2011 the Edmonton Oilers signed Hamilton to a three-year entry level contract. In his fourth season within the Oilers organization in 2014–15, Hamilton was recalled from the Oklahoma City Barons and made his NHL debut, going scoreless in his solitary game with the Oilers.

As a free agent over the summer, Hamilton was unable to attract NHL interest and on September 30, 2015, he signed his first European contract in agreeing to a one-year deal with Czech club, HC Sparta Prague of the Czech Extraliga.

On July 26, 2018, Hamilton continued his career in Europe by leaving Finland and agreeing to a one-year contract with Austrian outfit, Graz 99ers of the EBEL.

In August 2019 Hamilton moved to the UK to sign for EIHL side Belfast Giants.

After a inactive season due to the Coronavirus pandemic, Hamilton returned to hockey by signing with fellow EIHL side Manchester Storm in August 2021.

Personal
His father, Bruce Hamilton, was drafted 81st overall by the St. Louis Blues in the 1977 NHL amateur draft, and is the current owner and general manager of the WHL's Kelowna Rockets. Hamilton was born in Tacoma, Washington, when the franchise was known as the Tacoma Rockets. He was raised in Kelowna, British Columbia, after his father relocated the franchise to the city in 1995.

Career statistics

Regular season and playoffs

International

See also
 List of players who played only one game in the NHL

References

External links

1991 births
Living people
American men's ice hockey left wingers
Edmonton Oilers draft picks
Edmonton Oilers players
Graz 99ers players
Ice hockey people from British Columbia
Ice hockey people from Washington (state)
Oklahoma City Barons players
SaiPa players
Saskatoon Blades players
HC Sparta Praha players
Sportspeople from Kelowna
Sportspeople from Tacoma, Washington
Tappara players
HC TPS players
Belfast Giants players
Manchester Storm (2015–) players
Canadian ice hockey left wingers
Canadian expatriate ice hockey players in the Czech Republic
Canadian expatriate ice hockey players in Austria
Canadian expatriate ice hockey players in Finland
Canadian expatriate ice hockey players in Northern Ireland
Canadian expatriate ice hockey players in England
American expatriate ice hockey players in the Czech Republic
American expatriate ice hockey players in Austria
American expatriate ice hockey players in Finland
American expatriate ice hockey players in Northern Ireland
American expatriate ice hockey players in England